The Vilnia (also Vilnelė; , Vilnia) is a river in Lithuania. Its source is near the village of Vindžiūnai, 5 km south of Šumskas, at the Lithuanian-Belarusian border. The Vilnia is 79.6 km long and its basin covers 624 sq. km. For 13 km its flow makes the Belarus-Lithuania border, and the remaining 69 km are in Lithuania until it flows into the Neris River at Vilnius. Eventually, its waters, via the Neris's drainage into the Neman River, flow into the Baltic Sea. Its confluence with the Neris lies within the city of Vilnius, and the river's name was probably the source of the city's name.

Springs along its length contribute to its flow. A series of wells accessing the river's groundwaters, drilled in the early 20th century, remained a major supply of potable water in the city into the late 20th century.
The name of the river derives from the Lithuanian language word vilnis ("a surge") or vilnyti ("to surge"). Beneath it stands the Indo-European root wel-/wl- meaning "to roll", "to spin".

Vilnelė, the diminutive form of the original hydronym Vilnia, came into popular use in Lithuanian and in Soviet times largely replaced the latter because of Polish language influence — Poles translated Lithuanian name of the river with such diminutive form (Wilenka).

In an effort to restore the upstream migration of salmonids in the basin, a fish ladder was constructed on the Vilnia in 2000.

References

Rivers of Lithuania
Geography of Vilnius
International rivers of Europe
Belarus–Lithuania border